This was a new tournament in 2021.

Aryna Sabalenka won the title, defeating first-time finalist Veronika Kudermetova in the final, 6–2, 6–2. This was Sabalenka's third consecutive title, and her victory against Kudermetova in the final was her 15th consecutive victory, with both streaks dating back to Ostrava in 2020.

Seeds

  Sofia Kenin (quarterfinals)
  Elina Svitolina (quarterfinals)
  Karolína Plíšková (second round)
  Aryna Sabalenka (champion)
  Garbiñe Muguruza (third round)
  Elena Rybakina (quarterfinals)
  Elise Mertens (withdrew)
  Markéta Vondroušová (first round)
  Maria Sakkari (semifinals)
  Anett Kontaveit (first round)
  Jennifer Brady (first round)
  Karolína Muchová (second round, withdrew)
  Yulia Putintseva (third round)
  Amanda Anisimova (withdrew)
  Ons Jabeur (third round)
  Donna Vekić (first round)
  Ekaterina Alexandrova (third round)

Draw

Finals

Top half

Section 1

Section 2

Bottom half

Section 3

Section 4

Qualifying

Seeds

Qualifiers

Lucky losers

Qualifying draw

First qualifier

Second qualifier

Third qualifier

Fourth qualifier

Fifth qualifier

Sixth qualifier

Seventh qualifier

Eighth qualifier

References 
 Main draw
 Qualifying draw

Abu Dhabi Open
Abu Dhabi Women's Tennis Open